Balablok is a 1972 animated short written and directed by Břetislav Pojar exploring the human propensity for resorting to violence over reason.

Accolades
The 7 min 27 sec film received the 1973 Grand Prix du Festival for Short Film at the Cannes Film Festival.

Production
Produced by René Jodoin for the National Film Board of Canada, with music by Maurice Blackburn, the film was produced at a cost of C$37,000, utilizing cutout animation.

References

External links

Watch Balablok at NFB.ca

1972 films
1972 animated films
1972 short films
1970s animated short films
1970s political films
1972 war films
Animated films without speech
National Film Board of Canada animated short films
Quebec films
Short Film Palme d'Or winners
Canadian animated short films
Anti-war films
Cutout animation films
Films scored by Maurice Blackburn
Films directed by Břetislav Pojar
1970s Canadian films